The following is a list of areas of Hong Kong.

Hong Kong Island
 Central and Western District 
Central District
Admiralty
Mid-Levels
Soho 
Sai Wan
Kennedy Town 
Sai Ying Pun 
Shek Tong Tsui
Sheung Wan
Eastern District
Chai Wan 
North Point 
Braemar Hill
Fortress Hill
North Point Mid-Levels
Quarry Bay 
Kornhill 
Taikoo Shing 
Sai Wan Ho 
Shau Kei Wan 
Heng Fa Chuen
Aldrich Bay
A Kung Ngam
Southern District
Aberdeen
Ap Lei Chau
Chung Hom Kok
Siu Sai Wan 
Cyberport
Telegraph Bay
Deep Water Bay
Pok Fu Lam 
Sandy Bay 
Shan Ting
Wah Fu
Tin Wan
Repulse Bay 
Stanley
Shek O
Big Wave Bay 
Tai Tam 
Wong Chuk Hang
Nam Long Shan
Ocean Park
Wan Chai District 
Causeway Bay
Tin Hau
Caroline Hill
Happy Valley
Jardine's Lookout
Tai Hang 
Wan Chai

Kowloon
Kowloon City District 
Ho Man Tin
Hung Hom
Whampoa Garden
Kowloon City 
Kowloon Tong
Kowloon Tsai
Ma Tau Kok 
Ma Tau Wai
To Kwa Wan
Kwun Tong District
Cha Kwo Ling
Kwun Tong
Yuet Wah
Lam Tin
Lei Yue Mun
Ngau Tau Kok
Ngau Chi Wan
Ping Shek Estate
Shun Chi Court
Shun Lee Estate
Shun On Estate
Shun Tin Estate
Jordan Valley
Kowloon Bay 
Amoy Gardens
Sau Mau Ping
Yau Tong
Sham Shui Po District
Cheung Sha Wan
Lai Chi Kok
Lai Chi Kok MTR Station
Mei Foo Sun Chuen
Sham Shui Po
Nam Cheong Estate
Shek Kip Mei
Stonecutters Island
Yau Yat Chuen
Wong Tai Sin District
Diamond Hill 
Kowloon Peak (Fei Ngo Shan)
Choi Hung
Choi Hung Estate
Choi Wan Estate
Fu Shan Estate
San Po Kong
Tsz Wan Shan
Wang Tau Hom
Lok Fu Estate 
Wong Tai Sin (Chuk Un)
Tung Tau Estate
Yau Tsim Mong District
Hung Hom
King's Park
Kwun Chung
Mong Kok
Prince Edward
Tai Kok Tsui
Tsim Sha Tsui
Tsim Sha Tsui East
Yau Ma Tei 
Jordan

New Territories
 Islands District
Chek Lap Kok
Cheung Chau
Lamma Island
Hung Shing Yeh
Lo So Shing
Mo Tat
Pak Kok
Sham Wan
Sok Kwu Wan
Tung O
Yung Shue Ha
Yung Shue Wan
Lantau Island (Excluding Northeastern Part)
Discovery Bay
Chi Ma Wan
Mui Wo 
Ngong Ping
Pui O
Siu Ho Wan
Tai O
Tung Chung
Yam O
Peng Chau
 Kwai Tsing District
Kwai Chung
Kwai Fong Estate
Kwai Hing Estate
Lai King
Tai Wo Hau Estate
Tsing Yi
 North District
Closed Area
Fanling
Kwan Tei
Kwu Tung
Lin Ma Hang
Shenzhen East
Lo Wu
Man Kam To
Ping Che
Sha Tau Kok
Sheung Shui
Ta Kwu Ling
 Sai Kung District
Clear Water Bay
Hang Hau Village
Mang Kung Uk
Pik Uk
Po Toi O
Shui Bin Tsuen
Ta Ku Ling
Tai Au Mun
Tai Po Tsai
Tseng Lan Shue
Kau Sai Chau 
Kiu Tsui Chau 
Pak Sha Chau
Sai Kung Town
Ho Chung
Leung Shuen Wan 
Marina Cove
Tui Min Hoi
Yim Tin Tsai 
Tseung Kwan O New Town
Tseung Kwan O
Hang Hau
LOHAS Park
Metro City Plaza
Po Lam
Tiu Keng Leng / Rennie's Mill
Tseung Kwan O Industrial Estate
Junk Island 
Tung Lung Chau 
Yeung Chau
 Sha Tin District
Fo Tan
Kau To Shan
Cheung Sha Wan Rural
Ma Liu Shui
Chinese University of Hong Kong
Ma On Shan
Heng On Estate
Tai Shui Hang
Wu Kai Sha
Pak Shek Kok (Reclaimed Part)
Science Park
Sha Tin
Che Kung Miu
City One Shatin
Hin Keng Estate
Sha Tin Wai
Shek Mun Industrial Estate
Siu Lek Yuen
Tai Wai
Yuen Chau Kok
 Tai Po District
Hoi Ha Wan
Hong Lok Yuen
Kei Ling Ha Lo Wai
Lam Tsuen
Nai Chung
Pak Shek Kok
Science Park
Pat Sin Leng
Ping Chau 
Plover Cove
Science Park
Pak Shek Kok
Shap Sze Heung
Tai Po
Tai Wo Estate
Tai Po Industrial Estate
Tai Po Kau
Ting Kok
Tung Tsz
 Tsuen Wan District
Lantau Island, Tsuen Wan
Disney
Hong Kong Disneyland
Lo Wai
Ma Wan
Sham Tseng
Tsing Lung Tau 
Ting Kau
Tsuen Wan
 Tuen Mun District
Tuen Mun (Tuen Mun New Town)
Fu Tei
Lung Kwu Tan
San Hui
Siu Lam
So Kwun Wat
Gold Coast
Tai Lam Chung
 Yuen Long District
Kam Tin
Pat Heung
Shek Kong
San Tin
Shenzhen West
Lok Ma Chau
Huanggang
Mai Po
Tin Shui Wai
Yuen Long
Au Tau
Ha Tsuen
Lau Fau Shan
Ping Shan
Shap Pat Heung
Tai Tong
Yuen Long Town
Long Ping Estate
King's Road, North Point

See also
 Geography of Hong Kong
 Transport in Hong Kong
 Tourism in Hong Kong
Lists of places and features in Hong Kong
List of cities and towns in Hong Kong
 Villages
 Walled villages
Buildings and structures
 Declared monuments
Museums
Hospitals
Tunnels and bridges
Streets and roads
Tunnels and bridges
Bays
Beaches
Peaks, mountains and hills
Islands and peninsulas
Harbours
Channels
Rivers
Urban public parks and gardens

References

External links
 Hong Kong Antiquities and Monuments Office
 
 Hong Kong new towns
Digital Map
Hong Kong Place photo database
Hong Kong Tourism Association
Hong Kong Films
Hong Kong Photo 1946-1947 by Hedda Morrison

Areas
Areas
 
Hong Kong